Cristian Mark Junior Nascimento Oliveira Baroni (born 25 June 1983), known as Cristian Baroni or simply Cristian, is a Brazilian professional footballer who plays as a defensive midfielder for Atibaia.

Career

Early years
Cristian Baroni was champion of the Copa do Brasil in 2005 with Paulista de Jundiaí. In 2006, he was signed by Atlético Paranaense for a season. In 2007 went to Flamengo and had an important role participating in the rise of the Campeonato Brasileiro Série A campaign that year, in which Flamengo came out of the relegation zone and qualified for the Libertadores.

Corinthians
In 2008 Cristian Baroni remained in Flamengo, but was a reserve during many matches. At the end of 2008, he went to Corinthians and played for the time in the Campeonato Brasileiro Série B, following their relegation in 2007. In 2009 Campeonato Paulista, Cristian Baroni scored the goal that gave the victory to the Corinthians in the first leg of the semi-final against São Paulo missing 23 seconds to finish the game on Pacaembu. Cristian Baroni made obscene gestures to fans of São Paulo after scoring the late goal. A few months later he won the 2009 Copa do Brasil.

Fenerbahçe

On 20 July 2009, the Fenerbahçe announced the signing of the player for €5 million Fenerbahçe also have signed the left wing André Santos and the midfielder from Corinthians, details of the agreement were not disclosed. He was also under the spotlight when he celebrated goals and showed his six fingers to the other team's supporters. Baroni renewed his contract June 2012, extending his stay at the club till 2013–14, the new agreement saw the Brazilian midfielder make €1.8 million per season. Cristian Baroni has earned the love of a Fenerbahçe fans for his football. One of his most important matches was played in Germany against Borussia Mönchengladbach. In that game Cristian Baroni scored 2 goals and had 1 assist. He was famous in Süper Lig for the remote shots. On 28 August 2014, his contract with Fenerbahce was terminated with mutual agreement.

Return to Corinthians
On January 3, 2015, after several years of speculation, it was confirmed that Cristian Baroni had indeed returned to Corinthians. He had a verbal agreement since December, 2014 and signed the contract after being a free agent.

Honours
Paulista
Copa do Brasil: 2005

Flamengo
Taça Guanabara: 2008
Campeonato Carioca: 2008

Corinthians
Campeonato Brasileiro Série B: 2008
Campeonato Paulista: 2009
Copa do Brasil: 2009
Campeonato Brasileiro Série A: 2015

Fenerbahçe
Süper Lig: 2010–11, 2013–14 
Turkish Cup: 2011–12, 2012-13
Turkish Super Cup: 2009, 2014

Grêmio
Copa Libertadores: 2017

Career statistics

Club

Notes

References

External links
 
 
 
 

1983 births
Living people
Footballers from Belo Horizonte
Brazilian footballers
Brazilian expatriate footballers
Association football midfielders
Paulista Futebol Clube players
Club Athletico Paranaense players
CR Flamengo footballers
Sport Club Corinthians Paulista players
Fenerbahçe S.K. footballers
Grêmio Foot-Ball Porto Alegrense players
Associação Desportiva São Caetano players
Clube Atlético Juventus players
Sport Club Atibaia players
Campeonato Brasileiro Série A players
Süper Lig players
Expatriate footballers in Turkey
Brazilian expatriate sportspeople in Turkey